Apophis may refer to:

Ancient Egypt
 Apep or Apophis, an Ancient Egyptian mythological deity who was god of chaos.
 Apepi (pharaoh) or Apophis (reigned c. 1580–1550 BC), a 15th-Dynasty Hyksos pharaoh

Other uses
 99942 Apophis, a near-Earth asteroid
 Apophis (Stargate), a Stargate SG-1 fictional villain

See also
 'Apepi (fl. c. 1650 BC), a Lower Egyptian ruler hypothesised to be the king's son Apophis